"Craftsman furniture" refers to the Arts and Crafts Movement style furniture of Gustav Stickley's Craftsman Workshops.

History

Stickley began making American Craftsman furniture in 1900, though he did not change the name of his firm to the Craftsman Workshops until 1903.  It was sometimes popularly referred to as Mission Style Furniture, a term which Stickley despised. The company ceased making furniture in 1916.

See also
 Arts and Crafts Movement
 American Craftsman
 Mission Style Furniture

History of furniture
Arts and Crafts movement
American Craftsman architecture